Suso Cecchi D'Amico (21 July 1914 – 31 July 2010) was an Italian screenwriter and actress. She won the 1980 David di Donatello Award for lifetime career.  She worked with virtually all of the most celebrated post-war Italian film directors, and wrote or co-wrote many award-winning films—among them:

 Franco Zeffirelli: The Taming of the Shrew, Brother Sun, Sister Moon
 Luchino Visconti: Bellissima, Rocco and His Brothers, Senso, Ludwig, The Leopard, Conversation Piece
 Vittorio de Sica: Bicycle Thieves, Miracle in Milan
 Michelangelo Antonioni: Le Amiche
 Mario Monicelli: Big Deal on Madonna Street, Risate di gioia, Casanova 70
 Alessandro Blasetti: Lucky to Be a Woman
 Luigi Zampa: L'onorevole Angelina, To Live in Peace
 Francesco Rosi: Salvatore Giuliano
 Luigi Comencini: The Window to Luna Park
 Alberto Lattuada: Flesh Will Surrender

Cecchi D'Amico wrote the libretto for Nino Rota's opera I due timidi and collaborated on the script of William Wyler's Roman Holiday.  She was a member of the jury at the 1982 Cannes Film Festival. She was awarded the Golden Lion for lifetime achievement at the 1994 Venice film festival.

Life
Suso Cecchi D'Amico was born in Rome as Giovanna Cecchi and was the daughter of writer Emilio Cecchi. In 1938, she married the musicologist Fedele D'Amico (nickname: Lele), son of theatre critic Silvio D'Amico. They had three children who have themselves made significant contributions to Italian culture: Masolino, Silvia, and Catherine. Suso Cecchi D'Amico died in Rome ten days past her 96th birthday. She worked as a translator of literary works but was asked to read a screenplay, in order to give feedback. Later, she was asked to write one herself and her career as a screenwriter was launched.

Filmography

Screenwriter

 1946 : Mio figlio professore
 1946 : Rome, Open City
 1947 : Flesh Will Surrender
 1947 : To Live in Peace
 1947 : L'onorevole Angelina
 1948 : It's Forever Springtime
 1948 : Bicycle Thieves
 1949 : Heaven over the Marshes
 1949 : Fabiola
 1949 : The Walls of Malapaga
 1950 : His Last Twelve Hours
 1950 : Pact with the Devil 
 1950 : Father's Dilemma
 1950 : Romanzo d'amore
 1951 : Honeymoon Deferred 
 1951 : Bellissima
 1951 : Miracle in Milan
 1952 : The City Stands Trial
 1952 : Il Mondo le condanna
 1952 : Hello Elephant
 1952 : Red Shirts 
 1953 : Empty Eyes
 1953 : Eager to Live
 1953 : The Lady Without Camelias
 1953 : I Vinti
 1953 : Of Life and Love
 1954 : Senso
 1954 : Graziella
 1954 : 100 Years of Love
 1954 : A Slice of Life
 1954 : L'Allegro squadrone
 1954 : Too Bad She's Bad
 1954 : Forbidden
 1955 : Le amiche
 1956 : Kean
 1956 : The Window to Luna Park
 1956 : Lucky to Be a Woman
 1957 : Mariti in città
 1957 : Defend My Love
 1957 : White Nights
 1958 : Big Deal on Madonna Street
 1958 : La sfida
 1959 : ...and the Wild Wild Women
 1959 : Violent Summer
 1960 : The Passionate Thief
 1960 : La Contessa azzurra
 1960 : It Started in Naples
 1961 : The Wastrel
 1962 : Salvatore Giuliano
 1962 : The Best of Enemies
 1962 : Three Fables of Love
 1964 : Time of Indifference
 1965 : Me, Me, Me... and the Others
 1965 : Casanova 70
 1965 : Sandra
 1966 : Sex Quartet
 1966 : Shoot Loud, Louder... I Don't Understand
 1967 : The Taming of the Shrew
 1967 : The Stranger
 1968 : Pride and Vengeance
 1969 : Senza sapere niente di lei
 1969 : Infanzia, vocazione e prime esperienze di Giacomo Casanova, veneziano
 1970 : Metello
 1971 : Lady Liberty
 1972 : Perché?
 1972 : Il diavolo nel cervello
 1972 : Brother Sun, Sister Moon
 1972 : Le Avventure di Pinocchio (Film and TV cuts)
 1972 : Ludwig
 1973 : Amore e ginnastica
 1974 : Amore amaro
 1974 : Conversation piece
 1975 : Prete, fai un miracolo
 1976 : Tell Me You Do Everything for Me 
 1976 : L'innocente
 1976 : Caro Michele
 1977 : Jesus of Nazareth (miniserie TV)
 1983 : Les Mots pour le dire
 1984 : Bertoldo, Bertoldino e... Cacasenno
 1985 : The Two Lives of Mattia Pascal
 1985 : Cuore
 1986 : Caravaggio (UK)
 1986 : Speriamo che sia femmina
 1987 : Big Deal After 20 Years
 1987 : La storia
 1987 : Dark Eyes
 1987 : Ti presento un'amica
 1988 : I Picari
 1989 : Stradivari
 1989 : La Moglie ingenua e il marito malato (TV)
 1990 : Il Male oscuro
 1991 : Rossini! Rossini!
 1992 : Parenti serpenti
 1993 : La Fine è nota
 1994 : Cari fottutissimi amici
 1995 : Facciamo paradiso
 1998 : La Stanza dello scirocco
 1998 : Der Letzte Sommer – Wenn Du nicht willst
 1999 : Panni sporchi
 1999 : Un Amico magico: il maestro Nino Rota
 1999 : My Voyage to Italy
 2000 : Come quando fuori piove (TV)
 2000 : Il Cielo cade
 2005 : Raul – Diritto di uccidere
 2005 : Three Brothers
 2006 : The Roses of the Desert

As actress
 1962: Boccaccio 70 (segment "Renzo e Luciana")

References

External links

 
Literature on Suso Cecchi D'Amico

Writers from Rome
Italian screenwriters
Italian women screenwriters
Italian opera librettists
1914 births
2010 deaths
David di Donatello Career Award winners
Nastro d'Argento winners
Ciak d'oro winners
Women opera librettists